Ngo Ka-nin (born 26 September 1976) is a Hong Kong actor, singer and host.

Career
Ngo debuted as a radio DJ before he got into acting. He has also been one of the hosts for the entertainment news show, E-Buzz, since 2005 to 2007.

Ngo is best known for his role as Chiang Bit-man in the 2009 drama Rosy Business, which earned him the Most Improved Male Artiste award and a Best Supporting Actor nomination at the 2009 TVB Anniversary Awards. His popularity got a further boost when he delivered a sterling performance as Tong Kat in direct sequel No Regrets. He became a strong contender for the Best Supporting Actor award.

Ngo left TVB due to pay on 26 January 2020, but has continued working under a per series contract with the first series being Fraudstars, where he starred as the male lead for the first time with the network.

Personal life 
There have been conflicting reports about his age with some stating that he was born in the year 1976. In the reality program Midlife Crisis which was filmed and aired on ViuTV in mid 2020, Ngo stated that he is 47 years old, which meant he was born in 1972.

Ngo married longtime girlfriend, Betty, in 2016. He revealed in 2022 that they divorced amicably over 3 years ago after Ngo was spotted hanging out with Fraudstars costar Angel Chiang, but also clarified that he and Chiang are only friends.

Filmography

References

External links
TVB Artist Profile

|-
! colspan="3" style="background: #DAA520;" | TVB Anniversary Awards
|-

Hong Kong male television actors
TVB actors
1976 births
Living people
21st-century Hong Kong male actors
Hong Kong television presenters